Emily Wong (Traditional Chinese: 王歌慧; born 10 May 1990) is an artist of Amusic.

In 2006, Wong made her debut in a Hong Kong musical film A Melody Looking (directed by Leon Lai) and acted as Emily, a 16-year-old lovely and naive girl who seeks assistance from a detective to locate a girl. Her first song "I hear of... (Traditional Chinese: 聽說)" was released in the film. Then she collaborated with Leon Lai, Chapman To, Janice Vidal, Jill Vidal, Charles Ying singing along with them in the song, "I'll Never Fall in Love Again". Her first public appearance was "A Johnnie Walker Music Show" and soon caught the fans attention.

On 2 July 2007, she released her first Cantonese single "Liar" (Traditional Chinese: 大話精) with Amusic.

Filmography

Discography

Singles

References

External links 
 Emily Wong on Sina Weibo
 (official fans forum)

21st-century Hong Kong women singers
Living people
Musicians from Hangzhou
1990 births